Dreiling is German for "three of a kind" or "three-er" and may refer to:

Surnames 
Notable people with the surname include:

Greg Dreiling (born 1963), American basketball player
Nate Dreiling (born 1990), American football player

Other meanings 
Dreiling (coin), an historical coin of the Holy Roman Empire worth 3 pfennigs